Christina Elizabeth Nolan (born September 26, 1979) is an American attorney and politician who served as the United States Attorney for the District of Vermont from 2017 to 2021. Prior to becoming the U.S. Attorney, she was an Assistant United States Attorney in the District of Vermont, where she prosecuted a variety of criminal cases. A member of the Republican Party, she was a candidate for the United States Senate in the 2022 election, losing the Republican primary.

Nolan is considered a moderate Republican, and in her Senate campaign was endorsed by Governor Phil Scott. Had she been elected, she would have been the first woman and first LGBT person to represent Vermont in the United States Senate.

Early life and education 
Born in Burlington, Vermont, Nolan is a 1997 graduate of Rice Memorial High School in South Burlington. She graduated summa cum laude from the University of Vermont in 2001 with a Bachelor of Arts degree in political science and history. In 2004, she received her Juris Doctor degree magna cum laude from the Boston College Law School. Nolan was a senior editor of the Boston College Law Review and was admitted to the Order of the Coif.

Career 
After graduating from law school, she served as law clerk for Judge F. Dennis Saylor IV on the United States District Court for the District of Massachusetts.

Nolan previously served as an Assistant District Attorney in Middlesex County, Massachusetts. From 2005 to 2009, Nolan worked as a litigation associate at Goodwin Procter in Boston, where she specialized in white collar criminal defense. She served as an Assistant United States Attorney for the District of Vermont from 2010 to 2017. Nolan was recommended for the position of U.S. Attorney by U.S. Senator Patrick Leahy and Vermont Governor Phil Scott. She became the first woman to serve as U.S. Attorney for the District of Vermont.

On February 8, 2021, officials of the new Biden administration requested the resignations of all but two U.S. Attorneys, as is typical for incoming presidential administrations. On February 16, Nolan announced her resignation, effective February 28.

In January 2022, Nolan filed candidacy paperwork with the Federal Election Commission, reflecting that she was exploring a run for the Republican nomination for U.S. Senator from Vermont in 2022. On February 22, 2022, she formally announced her candidacy in an exclusive interview with Fox News, followed by release of a three-minute campaign video. If she had been elected, she would have been the first woman and first LGBT person to represent Vermont in the United States Senate.

Despite endorsements from prominent Vermont Republicans such as incumbent Vermont governor Phil Scott and former governor Jim Douglas, Nolan lost the Republican primary to Gerald Malloy, a more conservative candidate, by a small margin.

Political positions

Nolan has identified as "an independent thinker" and has expressed willingness to work across the aisle. She identifies as an environmentalist and supports LGBTQ+ rights; Nolan herself is lesbian. Nolan has voiced support for a public healthcare option, but she opposes Medicare for All. Nolan did not commit to voting for Mitch McConnell as majority leader.

Nolan also voiced her support for Judge Ketanji Brown Jackson's nomination to the Supreme Court of the United States; only three Republican Senators voted to confirm her.

Nolan had refused to disclose whether or not she voted for Donald Trump, who nominated her to the position of U.S. Attorney, stating that it might cast doubt on her impartiality in her role as of U.S. attorney.

References

External links

 Biography at Sheehey Furlong & Behm
 

1979 births
21st-century American lawyers
21st-century American women lawyers
American prosecutors
Assistant United States Attorneys
Boston College Law School alumni
Candidates in the 2022 United States Senate elections
District attorneys in Middlesex County, Massachusetts
Lesbian politicians
LGBT appointed officials in the United States
LGBT conservatism in the United States
LGBT lawyers
LGBT people from Vermont
Living people
People from Burlington, Vermont
United States Attorneys for the District of Vermont
University of Vermont alumni
Vermont lawyers
Vermont Republicans
District attorneys in Vermont